Blundy is a surname. Notable people with the surname include:

Anna Blundy (born 1970), British author and journalist
Brett Blundy (born 1959/1960), Australian billionaire businessman
David Blundy (1945–1989), British journalist and war correspondent
Jon Blundy FRS (born 1961), Professor of Petrology in the University of Bristol

Fictional
Laura Blundy (2000), historical novel by Julie Myerson set in Victorian London